Patryk Szysz (born 1 April 1998) is a Polish professional footballer who plays as a forward for İstanbul Başakşehir.

Career

Górnik Łęczna
Szysz started his adventure with football in Górnik Łęczna's youth teams. He made his debut in senior football on 21 June 2014 for the club's reserve team. As a 16-year-old, he played 10 minutes in a league match between Stalowa Poniatowa and Górnik II Łęczna. His breakthrough season turned out to be the 2015/2016 season, when Szysz began to play an increasingly important role in the team. A year later he was loaned to third league Motor Lublin. Then the 18-year-old striker appeared in 24 games and scored four goals, showing off, among others, a doublet in the clash with Cosmos Nowotaniec. After returning from loan, he was promoted to the first team squad of Górnik Łęczna and quickly became an important player.

Zagłębie Lubin
On 10 January 2019, Ekstraklasa club Zagłębie Lubin confirmed that Szysz had joined the club.

İstanbul Başakşehir
On 23 May 2022, Szysz moved to Süper Lig side İstanbul Başakşehir on a three-year deal.

On 21 July 2022, Szysz scored his first goal for İstanbul Başakşehir against Maccabi Netanya in the first leg of the 2022-23 UEFA Europa Conference League campaign in the second qualifying round. Szysz made his Süper Lig debut for İstanbul Başakşehir on 8 August 2022 as a starter against Kasımpaşa and scored his first goal making it 2–0 for Başakşehir, the match ended 4–0 for the home side.

Career statistics

References

External links

Polish footballers
1998 births
Living people
Association football forwards
Poland under-21 international footballers
Górnik Łęczna players
Motor Lublin players
Zagłębie Lubin players
İstanbul Başakşehir F.K. players
Ekstraklasa players
I liga players
III liga players
Polish expatriate footballers
Expatriate footballers in Turkey
Polish expatriate sportspeople in Turkey